The Cascadia Summit was a soccer competition featuring club teams from the Pacific Northwest region of North America. It was held in March 2011 and hosted in Tukwila, Washington, United States.

History

Based on the Cascadia Cup, the Cascadia Summit was a pre-season tournament between the Major League Soccer teams in the Pacific Northwest region of North America. The three main clubs will also take part in the Cascadia Cup, an annual cup rivalry between Major League Soccer (MLS) teams named after their markets' North American Soccer League (NASL) predecessors. The Seattle Sounders, Portland Timbers and Vancouver Whitecaps rivalry dates back to the NASL days.

Teams
The following five clubs participated in the 2011 tournament:

 Seattle Sounders FC
 Seattle Sounders FC Academy
 Portland Timbers
 Vancouver Whitecaps FC
 Vancouver Whitecaps Residency

Matches

Table

Statistics

Top scorers

Top assists

Own Goals
 David Horst against Vancouver

References

2011 domestic association football cups
2011 Major League Soccer season
2011 in sports in Washington (state)